Austa Densmore Sturdevant (1855-1936) was an American painter.

Biography
Sturdevant née Densmore was born in Blooming Valley, Pennsylvania in 1855. She married James Warner Sturdevant with whom she had two children. She studied at Allegheny College where she earned both a bachelor's and Master of Arts degree. She went on to study at the Art Students League of New York and the Metropolitan Museum of Art. In 1895 she went to Paris for several years to continue her studies. In Paris she exhibited at the Paris Salon.

When Sturdevant returned to the United States she established the Cragsmoor Inn in Cragsmoor, New York which became part of the art colony that flourished there. She died in 1936 in Kingston, New York.

Sturdevant's work is in the collection of the Smithsonian American Art Museum. Her papers are in the Archives of American Art at the Smithsonian Institution.

References

External links

 images of Sturdevant's work at the Cragsmoor Free Library

1855 births
1936 deaths
American women painters
19th-century American women artists
20th-century American women artists
19th-century American painters
20th-century American painters
People from Crawford County, Pennsylvania
Painters from Pennsylvania
Allegheny College alumni
Art Students League of New York alumni